Carla Díaz (born 19 July 1998) is a Spanish actress and dancer. She is known for her performances in Tierra de lobos, El Príncipe and Seis hermanas.

Biography 
Diaz was born in Madrid on 19 July 1998. Her parents operate a dance school which sparked her interest in dance from an early age. In 2007, at the age of nine, Díaz began her acting career in advertising, performing in a number of TV commercials. She landed her first major television role as Patricia Rozas in the mystery series Punta Escarlata, released in 2011. She also starred as the youngest of the four Lobo sisters in Tierra de lobos (2010–2014), as the youngest of the Ben Barek siblings in El Príncipe (2014–2016) and as the youngest of the six Silva sisters in Seis hermanas (2015–2017). In July 2020, she joined the cast of the fourth season of the teen drama series Elite, portraying Ari.

Filmography 

Television

References

External links 

1998 births
Living people
Actresses from Madrid
Spanish child actresses
Spanish television actresses
21st-century Spanish actresses